Kaohsiung Municipal Nanzih Senior High School(NTHS, Chinese: 高雄市立楠梓高級中學) is a comprehensive high school in Kaohsiung, Taiwan. Kaohsiung City Government planning to set up the first comprehensive high school.

Departments of Nanzih Senior High School

There are six departments,

General Education
Dept. of Academic Social Science(學術社會學程)
Dept. of Academic Natural Science(學術自然學程)

Vocational Education
Dept. of Applied English(應用英語學程)
Dept. of Applied German(應用德語學程)Newly established department in 2011 (Hold delay)
Dept. of Information Applications(資訊應用學程)
Dept. of Leisure Management(休閒事務學程)
Dept. of Visual Communication Design(視覺傳達設計學程)Cease enrollment in 2012

Spirit of the school

Dynamic / Excellent / Innovation(Chinese: 活力/卓越/創新)

External links

Kaohsiung Municipal Nanzih Senior High School

High schools in Taiwan
Schools in Kaohsiung
Educational institutions established in 2003
2003 establishments in Taiwan